Willibrordus Pouw (8 January 1903 – 16 February 1986) was a Dutch gymnast. He competed in seven events at the 1928 Summer Olympics.

References

External links
 

1903 births
1986 deaths
Dutch male artistic gymnasts
Olympic gymnasts of the Netherlands
Gymnasts at the 1928 Summer Olympics
Gymnasts from Amsterdam